Burial is the ritual act of placing a dead person or animal into the ground.

Burial or The Burial may also refer to:

Music
Burial (musician), William Emmanuel Bevan
Burial (Burial album), 2006
Burial (Death in June album), 1984
Burial (Extol album), 1998
Burials (album), a 2013 album by AFI
"Burial", a song by God Is an Astronaut from the album Ghost Tapes #10
"Burial", a song by Miike Snow from the 2009 album Miike Snow (album)
"Burial", a song by Yogi featuring Pusha T 
The Burial (English band), an Oi! band
The Burial (American band), a Christian metal band

Other uses
Burial (wrestling), a professional wrestling angle
The Burial (film), an American courtroom drama

See also

Buried (disambiguation)
Bury (disambiguation)